ZNS-1 (branded as Radio Bahamas) is the oldest broadcast station in the Bahamas. It has a News/Talk format, and broadcasts on 1540 kHz and 104.5 MHz in Nassau, with a repeater in Freeport on 107.7 MHz. It is under ownership of the Broadcasting Corporation of The Bahamas. The AM station has a Class A clear-channel allocation under NARBA and its nighttime signal can be heard throughout the Bahamas, most of Cuba, and southeastern Florida.

History

The Broadcasting Corporation of The Bahamas (BCB) was created as a state-owned radio broadcast service in 1936, out of a primary concern of providing accurate hurricane warnings to all of the islands of the Bahamas. A callsign of ZNS (standing for "Zephyr Nassau Sunshine) was chosen and the first broadcast was held for the coronation of Britain's King George V on May 12, 1936.

In the early days, ZNS broadcast for only two hours per day using a 500 watt transmitter. Programming included global news from the BBC, local news and musical recordings (from the BBC).

All programming from 1936-1950 was aired on a non-commercial basis by the colonial government, but advertising sponsors began to appear in the early 1950's and since that time the station has functioned as a government-owned but commercially funded station.

Today

Radio Bahamas(ZNS-1) operates from its premises on Third Terrace, Centreville in Nassau (the station's home since 1959). Today programming is a mix of news, cultural affairs, and music, and is described as being "the national voice of the Bahamas."

References

External links
 Broadcasting Corporation of The Bahamas
 FCC information for ZNS-1

Radio stations in the Bahamas
Clear-channel radio stations
Radio stations established in 1937
News and talk radio stations